Giles is an unincorporated community in Kanawha County, West Virginia, United States, along Cabin Creek. It lies between the unincorporated communities locally known as Ohley and Dawes

References 

Unincorporated communities in West Virginia
Unincorporated communities in Kanawha County, West Virginia
Coal towns in West Virginia